This list of Japanese hell ships encompasses those vessels used for transporting Allied prisoners of war during the Pacific War.


Select list
The names of the Japanese hell ships used during World War II includes some variants which are different names referring to the same ship.

 Aikoku Maru
 Aki Maru (Japanese Kyūjitai: 安藝丸, Shinjitai: 安芸丸)
 Akikase – on 18 March 1943, all 60 POWs on board were executed.
 Akitzuki
 Amagi Maru
 Anami Maru
 Aramis  (aka Teia Maru)
 Argentina Maru
 Arisan Maru – sunk by USS Shark or USS Snook 24 October 1944. 1,773 U.S. POWs killed.
 Asaka Maru - left Keppel Harbour, Singapore, on 4 July 1944. Wrecked in a storm between Luzon and Formosa. Survivors were rescued by two Japanese navy destroyers, and boarded the Hakusan Maru which arrived in Moji, Kyushu, on 28 August 1944. According to the personal account of a British soldier who was on this voyage, the Asaka Maru was old and built in Glasgow. 
 Asama Maru – sunk by USS Atule 1 November 1944. No POWs on board. ≠
 Awa Maru≠ – sunk by USS Queenfish 1 April 1945. No POWs on board. 
 Benjo Maru
 Brazil Maru‡ – bombed 15 December 1944. No POWs on board. 
 Burong
 Buyo Maru 
 Celebes Maru
 Chichibu Maru – sunk by  28 April 1943. No POWs on board. 
 Cho Saki Maru
 Chuka Maru‡
 Chuyo – sunk by USS Sailfish 4 December 1943. 20 of the 21 POWs on board died. 
 Clyde Maru
 Coral Maru
 Dai Moji Maru
 Dai Nichi Maru
 Daikeku Maru
 Dainichi Maru
 England Maru
 Enoshima Maru
 Enoura Maru – sunk by Allied aircraft on 9 January 1945, resulting in the deaths of approximately 400 Allied POWs.
 Enuri Maru
 Erie Maru

 France Maru
 Fuji Maru‡
 Fukkai Maru
 Fuku Maru
 Fukuji Maru
 Fukuju Maru
 Hakuroku Maru
 Hakusan Maru – sunk by USS Flier 4 June 1944. No POWs on board. 
 Hakushika Maru
 Haru Maru
 Harukiku Maru (治菊丸, Ex-Dutch Ship Van Waerwijck) – sunk by HMS Truculent 26 June 1944, 180 of 720 POWs and 27 of 55 Japanese troops killed
 Haruyasa Maru
 Hawaii Maru (はわい丸, Hawai Maru)
 Heiyo Maru
 Hioki Maru
 Hiyoki Maru
 Hofuku Maru – sunk on 21 September 1944 by American aircraft, while carrying 1,289 British and Dutch POWs. 1,047 of them died.
 Hokko Maru
 Hokusen Maru (北鮮丸)
 Hozan Maru
 Ikoma Maru – sunk on 21 January 1944 by USS Seahorse . 418 of 611 Indian POWs on board were killed.
 Ikuta Maru
 Imabari Maru (ex-De Klerk)
 Interisland Steamer
 Junyō Maru – torpedoed 18 November 1944 with loss of over 5,000 lives, including 1,300 POWs
Of 900 POWs, 400 perished. The remaining were transferred to the Kibitsu Maru and taken on to Japan
 Kaishun Maru
 Kaiun Maru
 Kakko Maru
 Kalgan Maru
No POWs on board. 
 Kenkon Maru (乾坤丸)
 Kenwa Maru
 Kenzan Maru
 Kiaota Maru
 Kibitzu Maru
 Kohho Maru
 Kokusei Maru
 Konosue Maru
 Koryu Maru
 Kunishima Maru
 Kurimata Maru
 Kyokko Maru
 Kyokusei Maru
 Lima Maru≠
Of the 1,816 British POWs, 842 perished.
 Maebashi Maru (前橋丸, Maebashi Maru)
 Makassar Maru
 Maros Maru
 Maru Go (5)
 Maru Hachi (8)
 Maru Ichi (1)
 Maru Ni (2)
 Maru No. 760
 Maru Roku
 Maru San (3)
 Maru Shi (4)
 Maru Shichi (7)
 Mati Mati Maru
 Matsu Maru
 Matti Matti Maru
 Maya Maru
 Mayebassi Maru
 Melbourne Maru‡
 Mishima Maru
 Miyo Maru
 Moji Maru
 Nagara Maru
 Nagata Maru
 Nagato Maru
 Nanshin Maru
 Naruto Maru
 Natoru Maru
 Nichimei Maru – Sunk on 15 January 1943 by U.S. aircraft, transporting 1,500 Japanese troops and 965 Dutch POWs of which 32 POWs died.
 Nishi Maru
 Nissyo Maru
 Nitikoku Maru
 Nitimei Maru
 Nitta Maru≠
 Yoshida Maru No. 1≠
 No. 2 Hikawa Maru ≠
 No. 6 Kotobuki Maru
 No. 7 Hoshi Maru
 No. 17 Nanshin Maru
 Noto Maru
 Oite
 SS Op ten Noort ( Tenno Maru -  Hikawa Maru No.2)
 Oryoki Maru
 Oryokko Maru
 Oryoku Maru – sunk by U.S. airplanes on 15 December 1944, killing 270 of the 1,620 POWs on board.
 OSK Ferry
 Otaro Maru
 Oyo Maru
 Pacific Maru
 Panama Maru
 Raihei Maru
Of 1,317 POWs, 1,159 POWs perished. 63 were rescued four days later by the submarines that sank the convoy she was in
 Rashin Maru (羅津丸)
 Rendsberg
 Rio de Janeiro Maru
 Roko Maru‡
 Rokyo Maru‡
 Ryūkyū Maru‡
 Samurusan Maru
 San Diego Maru
 Sandakan Steamer
 Sanko Maru
 Seikyo Maru
 Sekiho Maru (ex-Canadian Inventor)
 Shinsei Maru
 Shinyu Maru – damaged on 25 October 1942 by Dutch submarine HNLMS O 23 and abandoned. Some 100 out of 500 POWs drowned.
 Shoun Maru
 Sibijac
 Singapore Maru – left Batavia in Java 17 October 1942 with 3,000 British prisoners, arrived Moji, Japan, (via Singapore) 25 November 1942, 108 died on the journey.
 Singoto Maru
 Soong Cheong
 SS Subuk
All 548 British and Dutch POWs drowned or were shot trying to escape.
 Sugi Maru
 Suzuya Maru (ex-Hokkai Maru No. 1 also colloquially known as No. 107 or Otaru, Otari, or Otaro Maru)
 Tachibana Maru
 Taga Maru
 Taian Maru
 Taiko Maru
 Taikoku Maru
 Taka Maru
Some 300 allied POWs were amongst the 3,000 killed.
 Tanjong Penang
 Tateishi Maru, colloquially known as No. 86
 Tatsuta Maru≠
 Tattori Maru
 Tatu Maru
 Teia Maru (帝亞丸・帝亜丸)
 Teiryu Maru  (ex-Northwestern Miller, ex-Augsberg), colloquially known as No. 824
 Tenshin Maru
 Thames Maru
 Tiensen
 Tofuku Maru
 Tojuku Maru
 Toka Maru
 Toko Maru
 Tomohoku Maru 
 Toro Maru
 Tottori Maru
 Toyama Maru
 Toyofuku Maru
 Toyohashi Maru
 Tufuku Maru
 Ube Maru
 Ume Maru
 Umeda Maru
 Un'yō
 Uruppu Maru
 Ussuri Maru
 Usu Maru
 Wales Maru
 Weills Maru
 Winchester Maru
 Yamagata Maru
 Yashu Maru
 Yinagata Maru
 Yone Maru
 Yubi Maru
 Yuzan Maru

___

 ‡ Formerly in the fleet of O.S.K. Lines
 ≠ Formerly in the fleet of N.Y.K Lines

See also
 Prisoner-of-war camp
 List of POW camps in Japan

Notes

References
 Crager, Kelly E. (2008). Hell Under the Rising Sun: Texan POWs and the Building of the Burma – Thailand Death Railway. College Station, Texas: Texas A&M University Press. ; ; 
 Michno, Gregory. (2001). Death on the Hellships: Prisoners at Sea in the Pacific War. Annapolis: Naval Institute Press.  ; ; 
 Parkinson, James W. and Lee Benson (2006). Soldier Slaves: Abandoned by the White House, Courts, and Congress. Annapolis: Naval Institute Press. ; ; 
 Roscoe, Theodore and Richard G Voge (1949). United States Submarine Operations in World War II. Annapolis: United States Naval Institute.

External links
 
 

Hell ship
Hell ship
Hell ship
Hell ship
Hell ship
Japanese hell ships
Hell ship
Hell ships
Japanese hell ships